Beyond the Blue Horizon is a 1942 American adventure film directed by Alfred Santell and written by Frank Butler. The film stars Dorothy Lamour, Richard Denning, Jack Haley, Patricia Morison, Walter Abel, Helen Gilbert and Elizabeth Patterson. The film was released on June 25, 1942, by Paramount Pictures.

Plot
Circus lion tamer Jakra and publicist Squidge are intrigued when they hear about Tama, a beautiful woman from Malaya who may be the rightful heiress to an American family's fortune.

To find proof of the claim, Jakra and his girlfriend go with Squidge and another interested party, Professor Thornton, to the Malayan jungle where Tama was raised.  There they see her tiger, which can swim, and hear tales of a killer elephant responsible for many deaths.

Natives, expecting riches, turn against the visitors, but Tama's tiger comes to their rescue. They discover documents that prove Tama to be the legitimate heir to the fortune, then run from the rampaging elephant, which ultimately plunges off a cliff to its death.

Cast

Dorothy Lamour as Tama
Richard Denning as Jakra the Magnificent
Jack Haley as Squidge Sullivan
Patricia Morison as Sylvia
Walter Abel as Prof. Thornton
Helen Gilbert as Carol
Elizabeth Patterson as Mrs. Daly
Edward Fielding as Judge Chase
Gerald Oliver Smith as Chadwick
Frank Reicher as Sneath
Abner Biberman as La'oa
Charles Stevens as Panao
Charles Cane as Broderick
William Telaak as Willys
Gogo as Gogo
Ines Palange as the native nurse

References

External links 
 

1942 films
1940s English-language films
American adventure films
1942 adventure films
Paramount Pictures films
Films directed by Alfred Santell
Films scored by Victor Young
1940s American films